Resham Ki Dori is a 1974 Bollywood film starring Dharmendra and Saira Banu.

Plot & Reviews 

Ajit and Rajjo become orphans. Ajit, as
the older brother takes care of his
younger sister, at great personal
sacrifice.
When he tries to save his sister from
sexual assault, death occurs.
Ajit, and his little sister are separated
by powers that neither he or she
understand. Resham ki dori - is the
thread that brings them back together.
This is a story of three generations of
arrogance of wealth. It is also a story of
great wealth, dishonest managers,
anger, arrogance in semi- feudal India.
In a social context, it is a story of the
death of the textile industry in Parel,
Lower Parel in Bombay. It is a story of
the exploitation of labour. Some scenes
of labour poverty is gut wrenching.
It is a vision of a person who could
reverse the process of attrition in the
textile industry, if only till the textile
mill was set on fire for insurance.
It is a great movie to watch, if you are
looking out for the social context.
Dialogues are predictable, mostly
studio shot, editing is a bit loose but
overall, a slightly differently managed
film than the usual movies of the time.
1980's.
Excellent storyline, and some superb
acting.

Cast 

 Dharmendra as Ajit Singh
 Saira Banu as Anupama
  Kumud Chuggani as Rajjo
 Sujit Kumar as Dinesh
 Ramesh Deo as Police Inspector Ranbir
 Rajendernath as Banke Biharilal
  Rajan Haksar as Mastan
  Suresh as Mill owners Dharmendra’s Boss
 Sajjan as Vishal
 Meena T. as Sheela
 Sapru as Anupama's Grandfather
 Shivraj as Bade Babu
 Janki Das as Baby's Guardian
 Bhagwan Sinha as Bihari
 Keshav Rana as Jailer
 Sachin as Young Ajit
 Madhu
   Ajit Singh Deol as Shar Singh 
 Leela Mishra as Bade Babu's Wife (uncredited)
 Murad as The Judge (uncredited)
 Chand Usmani as Shanti (uncredited)
 Jayshree T. as Dancer in song "Sona Hai Chandi Hai"

Soundtrack 

Music composed by Shankar-Jaikishan and lyrics by Indiwar, Gopaldas Neeraj & Hasrat Jaipuri.

Trivia 

This film was to star Rajesh Khanna and Saira Banu in the lead, but Khanna had date issues so asked director to take some one else. Then director replaced Khanna with Dharmendra.

Awards

 22nd Filmfare Awards:

Nominated

 Best Actor – Dharmendra
 Best Supporting Actress – Jayshree T. 
 Best Music Director – Shankar–Jaikishan
 Best Lyricist – Indeevar for "Behna Ne Bhai Ki Kalai"
 Best Female Playback Singer – Suman Kalyanpur for "Behna Ne Bhai Ki Kalai"

References

External links 
 Resham Ki Dori (1974) by Internet Movie Database

1974 films
1970s Hindi-language films
Films scored by Shankar–Jaikishan